Ivan Andreyevich Goryunov (born 28 May 1988) is a Russian former professional football player.

Club career
He played in the Russian Football National League for FC Metallurg Krasnoyarsk in 2006.

External links
 
 

1988 births
Living people
Russian footballers
Association football forwards
FC Yenisey Krasnoyarsk players
FC Dynamo Barnaul players
FC Smena Komsomolsk-na-Amure players